Åløkke is a central-western neighbourhood of Odense, Funen, Denmark.  It contains a forested area, Åløkke Skov.

References

Suburbs of Odense